Acceleration Team Spain is the Spanish team of Formula Acceleration 1, an international racing series. They are run by the Moma Motorsport team, a new team founded by Carlos Mollá and Dani Clos.

History

2014 season 
Drivers: Victor Garcia, Oliver Campos-Hull

The team announced Victor Garcia as their driver for the inaugural Formula Acceleration 1 round in Portimao. He was replaced by Oliver Campos-Hull, moving from the Chinese team, for round 2 in Navarra.

Drivers

Complete Formula Acceleration 1 Results

References 

Spain
A
Spanish auto racing teams